The 1989–90 NBA season was the 20th season of the National Basketball Association in Cleveland, Ohio. During the off-season, the Cavaliers acquired second-year guard Steve Kerr from the Phoenix Suns. The Cavaliers got off to a slow start losing their first four games, on their way to a mediocre 10–16 start. Early into the season, the team traded Ron Harper to the Los Angeles Clippers in exchange for top draft pick Danny Ferry and Reggie Williams; Ferry was selected by the Clippers as the second overall pick in the 1989 NBA draft, but refused to play for them as he went to play overseas in Italy. At midseason, the team traded Chris Dudley to the New Jersey Nets, and released Williams to free agency. The Cavaliers struggled playing below .500 for the first half of the season, holding a 21–25 record at the All-Star break, but finished it on a strong note winning their final six games. The team finished the season with a 42–40 record, finishing 4th in the Central Division, as they advanced to the playoffs.

Mark Price averaged 19.6 points, 9.1 assists and 1.6 steals per game, while Brad Daugherty averaged 16.8 points and 9.1 rebounds per game, and Larry Nance provided the team with 16.3 points, 8.3 rebounds and 2.0 blocks per game. In addition, sixth man Hot Rod Williams provided with 16.8 points, 8.1 rebounds and 2.0 blocks per game, and Craig Ehlo contributed 13.6 points, 5.4 rebounds, 4.6 assists and 1.6 steals per game. 

In the Eastern Conference First Round of the playoffs, the Cavaliers lost in five games to the Philadelphia 76ers. For the season, the team slightly changed their road uniforms, replacing the team nickname "Cavs" with the city name "Cleveland" on their jerseys.

The team's season roster is featured in the video games NBA 2K16 and NBA 2K17.

Draft picks

Roster

Regular season

Season standings

Notes
 z, y – division champions
 x – clinched playoff spot

Record vs. opponents

Game log

|- style="background:#fcc;"
| 1 || November 3, 1989 || @ Chicago
|- style="background:#fcc;"
| 2 || November 4, 1989 || @ Indiana
|- style="background:#fcc;"
| 3 || November 8, 1989 || Orlando
|- style="background:#fcc;"
| 4 || November 10, 1989 || @ Washington(at Baltimore, MD)
|- style="background:#cfc;"
| 5 || November 11, 1989 || Boston
|- style="background:#cfc;"
| 6 || November 14, 1989 || @ New Jersey
|- style="background:#cfc;"
| 7 || November 15, 1989 || Golden State
|- style="background:#cfc;"
| 8 || November 17, 19898:00 pm EST || Atlanta
| W 131–125 (OT)
| Ehlo (31)
| Williams (14)
| Price (10)
| Richfield Coliseum16,135
| 4–4
|- style="background:#cfc;"
| 9 || November 22, 1989 || New York
|- style="background:#fcc;"
| 10 || November 24, 1989 || @ Detroit
|- style="background:#fcc;"
| 11 || November 25, 1989 || Houston
|- style="background:#cfc;"
| 12 || November 28, 1989 || Washington
|- style="background:#fcc;"
| 13 || November 29, 1989 || @ Philadelphia

|- style="background:#fcc;"
| 14 || December 1, 1989 || @ Boston
|- style="background:#fcc;"
| 15 || December 2, 1989 || Minnesota
|- style="background:#fcc;"
| 16 || December 5, 1989 || Utah
|- style="background:#fcc;"
| 17 || December 7, 1989 || @ L.A. Clippers
|- style="background:#cfc;"
| 18 || December 9, 1989 || @ Sacramento
|- style="background:#cfc;"
| 19 || December 11, 1989 || @ Utah
|- style="background:#cfc;"
| 20 || December 13, 1989 || Milwaukee
|- style="background:#cfc;"
| 21 || December 15, 1989 || Seattle
|- style="background:#fcc;"
| 22 || December 20, 1989 || Denver
|- style="background:#fcc;"
| 23 || December 22, 1989 || @ Milwaukee
|- style="background:#fcc;"
| 24 || December 25, 19893:30 pm EST || @ Atlanta
| L 104–115
| Williams, Williams (17)
| Ehlo,Nance (8)
| Price (11)
| The Omni13,357
| 10–14
|- style="background:#fcc;"
| 25 || December 27, 1989 || Detroit
|- style="background:#fcc;"
| 26 || December 28, 1989 || @ Charlotte
|- style="background:#cfc;"
| 27 || December 30, 1989 || Phoenix

|- style="background:#fcc;"
| 28 || January 3, 1990 || Chicago
|- style="background:#cfc;"
| 29 || January 5, 1990 || Washington
|- style="background:#cfc;"
| 30 || January 6, 1990 || @ Orlando
|- style="background:#fcc;"
| 31 || January 10, 1990 || Milwaukee
|- style="background:#cfc;"
| 32 || January 12, 1990 || @ Philadelphia
|- style="background:#cfc;"
| 33 || January 13, 1990 || New Jersey
|- style="background:#cfc;"
| 34 || January 15, 1990 || San Antonio
|- style="background:#fcc;"
| 35 || January 17, 1990 || @ Houston
|- style="background:#fcc;"
| 36 || January 19, 1990 || @ San Antonio
|- style="background:#fcc;"
| 37 || January 20, 1990 || @ Dallas
|- style="background:#fcc;"
| 38 || January 23, 1990 || Philadelphia
|- style="background:#fcc;"
| 39 || January 24, 19907:30 pm EST || @ Atlanta
| L 86–103
| Price (20)
| Keys,Nance (6)
| Price (7)
| The Omni14,220
| 16–23
|- style="background:#cfc;"
| 40 || January 26, 1990 || @ Minnesota
|- style="background:#cfc;"
| 41 || January 27, 1990 || @ Indiana
|- style="background:#cfc;"
| 42 || January 30, 1990 || @ Miami

|- style="background:#fcc;"
| 43 || February 3, 1990 || Detroit
|- style="background:#cfc;"
| 44 || February 5, 1990 || L.A. Clippers
|- style="background:#fcc;"
| 45 || February 6, 1990 || @ Detroit
|- style="background:#cfc;"
| 46 || February 8, 1990 || Miami
|- style="text-align:center;"
| colspan="9" style="background:#bbcaff;"|All-Star Break
|- style="background:#fcc;"
| 47 || February 14, 1990 || Indiana
|- style="background:#cfc;"
| 48 || February 16, 19908:00 pm EST || Atlanta
| W 109–101
| Nance (30)
| Daugherty (14)
| Price (9)
| Richfield Coliseum18,988
| 22–26
|- style="background:#fcc;"
| 49 || February 17, 1990 || @ New York
|- style="background:#fcc;"
| 50 || February 19, 1990 || Dallas
|- style="background:#cfc;"
| 51 || February 21, 1990 || Portland
|- style="background:#cfc;"
| 52 || February 23, 1990 || Orlando
|- style="background:#cfc;"
| 53 || February 25, 1990 || Charlotte
|- style="background:#fcc;"
| 54 || February 27, 1990 || @ Portland

|- style="background:#fcc;"
| 55 || March 1, 1990 || @ Denver
|- style="background:#fcc;"
| 56 || March 2, 1990 || @ L.A. Lakers
|- style="background:#fcc;"
| 57 || March 4, 1990 || @ Phoenix
|- style="background:#fcc;"
| 58 || March 6, 1990 || @ Seattle
|- style="background:#fcc;"
| 59 || March 8, 1990 || @ Golden State
|- style="background:#cfc;"
| 60 || March 11, 1990 || @ Milwaukee
|- style="background:#cfc;"
| 61 || March 13, 1990 || Philadelphia
|- style="background:#cfc;"
| 62 || March 15, 1990 || L.A. Lakers
|- style="background:#cfc;"
| 63 || March 17, 1990 || Indiana
|- style="background:#cfc;"
| 64 || March 18, 1990 || @ Orlando
|- style="background:#fcc;"
| 65 || March 21, 1990 || @ Boston
|- style="background:#fcc;"
| 66 || March 23, 1990 || @ Chicago
|- style="background:#cfc;"
| 67 || March 24, 1990 || New Jersey
|- style="background:#cfc;"
| 68 || March 26, 1990 || Sacramento
|- style="background:#fcc;"
| 69 || March 28, 1990 || Chicago
|- style="background:#cfc;"
| 70 || March 30, 1990 || @ Miami

|- style="background:#cfc;"
| 71 || April 1, 1990 || Indiana
|- style="background:#fcc;"
| 72 || April 3, 1990 || @ New York
|- style="background:#cfc;"
| 73 || April 4, 19907:30 pm EDT || Atlanta
| W 101–95
| Daugherty (24)
| Daugherty (13)
| Price (20)
| Richfield Coliseum18,074
| 35–38
|- style="background:#fcc;"
| 74 || April 6, 1990 || Boston
|- style="background:#cfc;"
| 75 || April 8, 1990 || Detroit
|- style="background:#fcc;"
| 76 || April 11, 1990 || @ Chicago
|- style="background:#cfc;"
| 77 || April 12, 1990 || @ Washington
|- style="background:#cfc;"
| 78 || April 14, 1990 || Miami
|- style="background:#cfc;"
| 79 || April 17, 1990 || @ Milwaukee
|- style="background:#cfc;"
| 80 || April 18, 1990 || @ New Jersey
|- style="background:#cfc;"
| 81 || April 20, 1990 || @ Orlando
|- style="background:#cfc;"
| 82 || April 22, 1990 || New York

Playoffs

|- align="center" bgcolor="#ffcccc"
| 1
| April 28
| @ Philadelphia
| L 106–111
| Hot Rod Williams (23)
| Hot Rod Williams (10)
| Mark Price (12)
| Spectrum15,319
| 0–1
|- align="center" bgcolor="#ffcccc"
| 2
| May 1
| @ Philadelphia
| L 101–107
| Mark Price (27)
| Brad Daugherty (13)
| Craig Ehlo (8)
| Spectrum18,168
| 0–2
|- align="center" bgcolor="#ccffcc"
| 3
| May 3
| Philadelphia
| W 122–95
| Craig Ehlo (25)
| Ehlo, Daugherty (10)
| Ehlo, Daugherty (9)
| Richfield Coliseum16,317
| 1–2
|- align="center" bgcolor="#ccffcc"
| 4
| May 5
| Philadelphia
| W 108–96
| Brad Daugherty (34)
| Brad Daugherty (9)
| Mark Price (18)
| Richfield Coliseum17,106
| 2–2
|- align="center" bgcolor="#ffcccc"
| 5
| May 8
| @ Philadelphia
| L 97–113
| Brad Daugherty (25)
| Hot Rod Williams (13)
| Craig Ehlo (5)
| Spectrum18,168
| 2–3
|-

Player stats

Season

Playoffs

Player Statistics Citation:

Awards and records

Awards

Records

Milestones

All-Star

Transactions

Trades

Free agents

Development league

References

External links
 Cleveland Cavaliers on Database Basketball
 Cleveland Cavaliers on Basketball Reference

Cleveland Cavaliers seasons
1989 in sports in Ohio
Cleve